Perithemis is a genus of dragonflies commonly known as Amberwings. They are characterized by their small size and the amber wings of the male.

Perithemis includes the following species:
Perithemis bella 
Perithemis capixaba 
Perithemis cornelia  - Orange Amberwing
Perithemis domitia  - Slough Amberwing
Perithemis electra  - Golden Amberwing
Perithemis icteroptera 
Perithemis intensa  - Mexican Amberwing
Perithemis lais  - Fine-banded Amberwing
Perithemis mooma 
Perithemis parzefalli  - Clear-tipped Amberwing
Perithemis rubita  - Ruby Amberwing
Perithemis tenera  - Eastern Amberwing
Perithemis thais

References

Libellulidae
Anisoptera genera
Odonata of North America
Taxa named by Hermann August Hagen